Padam Bahadur Rokaya is a Nepalese politician and Minister for Physical Infrastructure and Urban Development of Karnali Province. He is also a member of Provincial Assembly of Karnali Province belonging to the CPN (Unified Socialist). Rokaya, a resident of Kankasundari Rural Municipality, was elected via 2017 Nepalese provincial elections from Jumla 1(B). Earlier, he was a party candidate with the CPN-UML back in 2017. At present, he is a party candidate from the CPN (Unified Socialist).

Electoral history

2017 Nepalese provincial elections

References

Living people
Year of birth missing (living people)
21st-century Nepalese politicians
Members of the Provincial Assembly of Karnali Province
Communist Party of Nepal (Unified Socialist) politicians
People from Jumla District